Gavin Ron Robertson (born 28 May 1966) is a former Australian cricketer. He was a right-handed offbreak bowler and a lower-order batsman.

Career
Robertson made his debut for the New South Wales Blues in 1987. Two seasons later he moved to Tasmania in search of more playing time. He moved back to New South Wales after 2 seasons with the Tigers and was part of the successful 1992–93 Sheffield Shield-winning team. He retired in 2000.

Robertson made his Test debut for Australia in March 1998 against India in Chennai. He claimed 5 wickets in total. In Australia's first innings, by scoring 57, he shared a 96 runs partnership with Ian Healy for the 9th wicket to help the Australians for taking first innings lead. However, a Sachin Tendulkar century helped the Indians to post a match winning total in the second Innings.

Robertson currently hosts Talkin Sport on 2SM.  He is also a regular panelist of Fox Sports program Bill & Boz.

Personal life
Robertson is a member of the band Six & Out with four former New South Wales teammates. He plays the drums and supplies backing vocals. In May 2019 he was diagnosed with a brain tumour.

References

External links

1966 births
Living people
Australia One Day International cricketers
Australia Test cricketers
New South Wales cricketers
Tasmania cricketers
Cricketers at the 1998 Commonwealth Games
Commonwealth Games silver medallists for Australia
Australian cricketers
Cricketers from Sydney
Commonwealth Games medallists in cricket
Medallists at the 1998 Commonwealth Games